In fields such as epidemiology, social sciences, psychology  and statistics, an observational study draws inferences from a sample to a population where the independent variable is not under the control of the researcher because of ethical concerns or logistical constraints. One common observational study is about the possible effect of a treatment on subjects, where the assignment of subjects into a treated group versus a control group is outside the control of the investigator. This is in contrast with experiments, such as randomized controlled trials, where each subject is randomly assigned to a treated group or a control group. Observational studies, for lacking an assignment mechanism, naturally present difficulties for inferential analysis.

Motivation 
The independent variable may be beyond the control of the investigator for a variety of reasons:

 A randomized experiment would violate ethical standards.  Suppose one wanted to investigate the abortion – breast cancer hypothesis, which postulates a causal link between induced abortion and the incidence of breast cancer.  In a hypothetical controlled experiment, one would start with a large subject pool of pregnant women and divide them randomly into a treatment group (receiving induced abortions) and a control group (not receiving abortions), and then conduct regular cancer screenings for women from both groups.  Needless to say, such an experiment would run counter to common ethical principles.  (It would also suffer from various confounds and sources of bias, e.g. it would be impossible to conduct it as a blind experiment.)  The published studies investigating the abortion–breast cancer hypothesis generally start with a group of women who already have received abortions. Membership in this "treated" group is not controlled by the investigator: the group is formed after the "treatment" has been assigned.
 The investigator may simply lack the requisite influence.  Suppose a scientist wants to study the public health effects of a community-wide ban on smoking in public indoor areas.  In a controlled experiment, the investigator would randomly pick a set of communities to be in the treatment group.  However, it is typically up to each community and/or its legislature to enact a smoking ban.  The investigator can be expected to lack the political power to cause precisely those communities in the randomly selected treatment group to pass a smoking ban.  In an observational study, the investigator would typically start with a treatment group consisting of those communities where a smoking ban is already in effect.
 A randomized experiment may be impractical.  Suppose a researcher wants to study the suspected link between a certain medication and a very rare group of symptoms arising as a side effect.  Setting aside any ethical considerations, a randomized experiment would be impractical because of the rarity of the effect.  There may not be a subject pool large enough for the symptoms to be observed in at least one treated subject.  An observational study would typically start with a group of symptomatic subjects and work backwards to find those who were given the medication and later developed the symptoms. Thus a subset of the treated group was determined based on the presence of symptoms, instead of by random assignment.
Many randomized controlled trials are not broadly representative of real-world patients and this may limit their external validity. Patients who are eligible for inclusion in a randomized controlled trial are usually younger, more likely to be male, healthier and more likely to be treated according to recommendations from guidelines. If and when the intervention is later added to routine-care, a large portion of the patients who will receive it may be old with many concomitant diseases and drug-therapies, although these particular patient groups will not have been studied in the initial experimental trials. An observational study that examines the real-world patients in everyday routine care can complement the results from the randomized trial in order to be more generally applicable in the patient population.

Types 

Case-control study: study originally developed in epidemiology, in which two existing groups differing in outcome are identified and compared on the basis of some supposed causal attribute.
Cross-sectional study: involves data collection from a population, or a representative subset, at one specific point in time.
Longitudinal study:  correlational research study that involves repeated observations of the same variables over long periods of time. Cohort study and Panel study are particular forms of longitudinal study.

Degree of usefulness and reliability 

"Although observational studies cannot be used to make definitive statements of fact about the "safety, efficacy, or effectiveness" of a practice, they can:

 provide information on 'real world' use and practice;
 detect signals about the benefits and risks of...[the] use [of practices] in the general population;
 help formulate hypotheses to be tested in subsequent experiments;
 provide part of the community-level data needed to design more informative pragmatic clinical trials; and
 inform clinical practice."

Bias and compensating methods 

In all of those cases, if a randomized experiment cannot be carried out, the alternative line of investigation suffers from the problem that the decision of which subjects receive the treatment is not entirely random and thus is a potential source of bias. A major challenge in conducting observational studies is to draw inferences that are acceptably free from influences by overt biases, as well as to assess the influence of potential hidden biases. The following are a non-exhaustive set of problems especially common in observational studies.

Matching techniques bias 
In lieu of experimental control, multivariate statistical techniques allow the approximation of experimental control with statistical control by using matching methods. Matching methods account for the influences of observed factors that might influence a cause-and-effect relationship. In healthcare and the social sciences, investigators may use matching to compare units that nonrandomly received the treatment and control. One common approach is to use propensity score matching in order to reduce confounding, although this has recently come under criticism for exacerbating the very problems it seeks to solve.

Multiple comparison bias 
Multiple comparison bias can occur when several hypotheses are tested at the same time. As the number of recorded factors increases, the likelihood increases that at least one of the recorded factors will be highly correlated with the data output simply by chance.

Omitted variable bias 
An observer of an uncontrolled experiment (or process) records potential factors and the data output: the goal is to determine the effects of the factors. Sometimes the recorded factors may not be directly causing the differences in the output. There may be more important factors which were not recorded but are, in fact, causal.  Also, recorded or unrecorded factors may be correlated which may yield incorrect conclusions.

Selection bias 

Another difficulty with observational studies is that researchers may themselves be biased in their observational skills. This would allow for researchers to (either consciously or unconsciously) seek out the information they're looking for while conducting their research. For example, researchers may exaggerate the effect of one variable, or downplay the effect of another: researchers may even select in subjects that fit their conclusions. This selection bias can happen at any stage of the research process. This introduces bias into the data where certain variables are systematically incorrectly measured.

Quality 
A 2014 Cochrane review concluded that observational studies produce results similar to those conducted as randomized controlled trials. The review reported little evidence for significant effect differences between observational studies and randomized controlled trials, regardless of design, heterogeneity, or inclusion of studies of interventions that assessed drug effects.

See also 
 Correlation does not imply causation
 Observation
 Difference-in-differences
 Scientific method

References

Further reading 
 
 "NIST/SEMATECH Handbook on Engineering Statistics" at NIST

 
Statistical data types
Design of experiments